Philip de Meldrum, Lord of Meldrum, Justiciar of Scotia, was a Scottish noble. He was a son of Philippe de Fedarg.

Philip was granted the position of Justiciar of Scotia in 1251, which was the most senior legal office in the Kingdom of Scotland. This position covered the area of Scotland north of the River Forth and River Clyde.

Marriage and issue
Philip married Agnes, daughter of William Comyn, Lord of Badenoch, Justiciar of Scotland and Marjory, Countess of Buchan, they are known to have had the following issue:
William de Meldrum
Thomas de Meldrum
Alexander de Meldrum

Notes

Citations

References
 

Year of birth unknown
Year of death unknown
13th-century Scottish people